Fuyang is a town under the administration of and in the south of Chao'an District, Chaozhou, Guangdong, China, located south-southwest of downtown Chaozhou. Fuyang has an area of 38.5 square kilometers and a population of 97,000. , it has four residential communities and 35 villages under its administration.

Notes

External links
Official website of Fuyang Town Government

Chaozhou
Township-level divisions of Guangdong